Kulin may refer to:

Places
Kulin, Western Australia, a small town in Australia
 Shire of Kulin, a local government area 
Kulin, Iran, a village near Tehran
Kulin, Lower Silesian Voivodeship, a village in south-west Poland
Kulin, Kuyavian-Pomeranian Voivodeship, a village in north-central Poland
3019 Kulin, a main-belt asteroid

Other uses
Kulin people, an Australian Aboriginal nation 
Kulin languages, a group of Australian languages
Kulin Brahmin, a clan of India
Kulin Kayastha, a clan of India
Kulin (surname) (including a list of people with the name)
Ban Kulin,  Ban of Bosnia from 1180 to 1204

See also 
Culin (disambiguation)
Kulen, a type of sausage
Kulinism, a type of Hindu caste and marriage rules
Qulin, a town in the United States

Language and nationality disambiguation pages